Bunyangabu District is a district in the Western Region of Uganda. The town of Kibiito is the political and administrative center of the district. However, the town of Rwimi, (pop. 16,256)  is the largest and main commercial center of Bunyangabu.

Location
Bunyangabu is bordered by Kabarole District to the north, Kamwenge District to the east, Kasese District to the south and Bundibugyo District to the west.

Overview
Before 1 July 2017, Bunyangabu was a county in neighboring Kabarole District. On that day, the new district became operational. Bunyangabu comprises Rwimi, Kibiito, Buheesi, Kiyombya, Kisomoro, Kabonero, Kateebwa sub-counties and the urban centers of Rwimi, Kibiito and Rubona.  During the first 12 months of operations, the new district has been allocated USh12,758,591,000.

Population
The national census and household survey conducted on 27 August 2014, enumerated the population of the district (at that time, Bunyangabu county in Kabarole District) at 171,292 people.

Prominent people
Notable people who hail from Bunyangabu include: (1) Adolf Mwesige, the current area member of parliament and current minister of defence, (2) Peace Mutuuzo, the current Minister of State for Gender and Culture in the Cabinet of Uganda, and (3) the deputy Resident District Commissioner for Kabarole District, Rose Monday Byabasaija.

Administration
On 1 July 2017, the elected 14 sub-county representatives, who represented Bunyangabu county at the Kabarole district council were transferred to Kibiito to form the district council for the new district. On 3 July 2017 the 14 Bunyangabu district councilors elected, from among themselves, Peter Musingiuzi, to serve as interim district chairman (Local Council V chairperson), until the Uganda Electoral Commission can hold district-wide elections. Prior to his current position, Peter Musinguzi served as the secretary for finance in the Kabarole district council.

See also
 Fort Portal–Kasese–Mpondwe Road

References

External links
 Bunyangabu District Information Portal
The Evolution of Ugandan Districts

 
Districts of Uganda
Western Region, Uganda
Toro sub-region